The Detroit Hydrofest (branded as the Metro Detroit Chevy Dealers Detroit Hydrofest for sponsorship reasons) is a H1 Unlimited hydroplane boat race held in August on the Detroit River in Detroit, Michigan.

History
The first race held on the Detroit River was the Gold Cup, in 1916. The community-owned Miss Detroit won the Gold Cup in 1915 on Manhasset Bay, outside of New York City, and earned the right to defend it the following year on home waters. Miss Detroit was a single-step hydroplane, equipped with a 250-horsepower Sterling engine. The designer was the distinguished Christopher Columbus Smith of Chriscraft fame.

The race was run annually after being part of the Gold Cup, and later became known as the APBA Challenge Cup then APBA Gold Cup.

Starting in 1963, the Gold Cup race location was determined by the city with the highest financial bid, rather than by the yacht club of the winning boat. Since 1980, Detroit has hosted the Gold Cup race 30 times, including every year from 1990 through 2014, and from 2016 through 2018. From 1990 to 2014 the Detroit River Regatta Association (DRRA) hosted the APBA Gold Cup. When the DRRA announced in 2015 that it couldn't continue hosting the Gold Cup, the Spirit of Detroit Hydrofest was formed and obtained a multi-year sponsorship from UAW-GM. In 2019, promoters in Detroit elected not to host the Gold Cup and the leaders of the Madison Regatta won the bid for the right to hold the Gold Cup.

Past winners 

Note: * - The APBA unlimited hydroplane class began in 1946.

References

External links
Spirit of Detroit Hydrofest website
H1 Unlimited website

H1 Unlimited
Racing motorboats
Hydroplanes
Motorboat racing
Recurring sporting events established in 1916
1916 establishments in Michigan
Detroit River
Sports in Detroit